Orchesography is an enhanced form of choreography that includes details of the music to accompany the dance.

Orchesography may also refer to:
Orchesography, dancing manual by Thoinot Arbeau (1598) 
Orchesography, dancing manual by Raoul Auger Feuillet (1701)
Orchesography (album), by English new wave band Wang Chung